Admiral of the Sea is the first EP by the American alternative rock band Nova Mob, a band formed by former Hüsker Dü drummer Grant Hart. It was released in February 1991 by Rough Trade.

Track listing
All songs written by Grant Hart, except where noted

 Track 5 is recorded live at La Dolce Vita, Lausanne, Switzerland, 13 May 1990

Personnel
 Grant Hart – vocals, guitar, production
 Tom Merkl – bass, production
 Michael Crego – drums, production
 Dave Kent – production, engineering 
 Steve Noonan – assistant engineering
 Steve McLellan – collage
 Flat Earth – sleeve layout

Notes

1991 EPs
Grant Hart albums